Nghan, also known as Kamantan, is a Plateau language of Nigeria. It is spoken by the Anghan people.

References

Central Plateau languages
Languages of Nigeria